USS Feldspar (IX-159), a  designated an unclassified miscellaneous vessel, was the only ship of the United States Navy to be named for feldspar.

She was acquired by the Navy and placed in service on 11 August 1944. She was towed to the Philippine Islands where she provided United States Army and United States Marine Corps supplies. Feldspar was stricken from the Naval Vessel Register on 28 August 1946 and sold.

References

External links
 

 

Trefoil-class concrete barges
1944 ships